Comet Encke , or Encke's Comet (official designation: 2P/Encke), is a periodic comet that completes an orbit of the Sun once every 3.3 years. (This is the shortest period of a reasonably bright comet; the faint main-belt comet 311P/PanSTARRS has a period of 3.2 years.) Encke was first recorded by Pierre Méchain on 17 January 1786, but it was not recognized as a periodic comet until 1819 when its orbit was computed by Johann Franz Encke. Like Halley's Comet, it is unusual in its being named after the calculator of its orbit rather than its discoverer. Like most comets, it has a very low albedo, reflecting only 4.6% of the light its nucleus receives, although comets generate a large coma and tail that can make them much more visible during their perihelion (closest approach to the Sun). The diameter of the nucleus of Encke's Comet is 4.8 km.

Discovery 
As its official designation implies, Encke's Comet was the first periodic comet discovered after Halley's Comet (designated 1P/Halley). It was independently observed by several astronomers, the first two being Pierre Méchain and Charles Messier in 1786. It was next observed by Caroline Herschel in 1795 and was "discovered" for a third time by Jean-Louis Pons in 1818. Its orbit was calculated by Johann Franz Encke, who through laborious calculations was able to link observations of comets in 1786 (designated 2P/1786 B1), 1795 (2P/1795 V1), 1805 (2P/1805 U1) and 1818 (2P/1818 W1) to the same object. In 1819 he published his conclusions in the journal Correspondance astronomique, and predicted correctly its return in 1822 (2P/1822 L1). It was recovered by Carl Ludwig Christian Rümker at Parramatta Observatory on 2 June 1822.

Orbit 
Comets are in unstable orbits that evolve over time due to perturbations and outgassing. Given Encke's low orbital inclination near the ecliptic and brief orbital period of 3 years, the orbit of Encke is frequently perturbed by the inner planets. Encke is currently close to a 7:2 mean motion resonance with Jupiter, and it is possible that some of the larger fragments shed by the comet, or released by a larger progenitor of the comet, are trapped in this resonance.

On 4 July 1997, Encke passed 0.19 AU from Earth, and on June 29, 2172, it will make a close approach of roughly 0.1735 AU. On 18 November 2013, it passed  from Mercury. Close approaches to Earth usually occur every 33 years.

Of the numbered comets less than 321P, only 96P/Machholz gets closer to the Sun.

Observations 
The comet has been observed at every perihelion since 1818 except 1944.

An attempt to photograph the comet close to aphelion was made on 2 July 1913 using the Mount Wilson 60-inch telescope but the resulting photographic plate was lost in the mail. A second attempt using the same telescope was made on 1 September 1913 and this showed an object in about the right position (1.5 arcminutes from its then predicted position) but orbital uncertainties made it impossible to be sure of its identity. A recalculation of Encke's orbit in the 1970s resulted in a calculated position only a few arcseconds (2.0 in ascension and 4.6 in declination) from the imaged object meaning the object probably was Encke.

In March 1918 the Greenwich 28-inch aperture telescope took observations of Encke (1917c).

An observer of Encke's in March 1918 had this to say of the comet on March 12, comparing to the early March 9 observation, "The comet much shaper, brighter, smaller; its diameter was 1 1/2', magnitude 7.7 (B.D. scale). Its magnitude in the 6-inch Corbett was almost stellar, but in the 28 inch no definitive nucleus could be seen."

A number of attempts were made to image the comet around the aphelion of 3 September 1972. Elizabeth Roemer and G. McCorkle photographed the comet on 15 August. R.E. McCrosky and C.-Y. Shao photographed it on 5 September and Elizabeth Roemer this time with M.R. Gonzales photographed the comet on 13 September.

In 1980 Encke was the first comet to be detected by radar.

In April 1984 the Pioneer Venus Orbiter observed the comet in ultra-violet and made measurements of its rate of water loss.

The failed CONTOUR mission was launched to study this comet, and also Schwassmann–Wachmann 3.

On 20 April 2007, STEREO-A observed the tail of Comet Encke to be temporarily torn off by magnetic field disturbances caused by a coronal mass ejection (a blast of solar particles from the Sun). The tail grew back due to the continuous shedding of dust and gas by the comet.

Meteor showers 

Comet Encke is believed to be the originator of several related meteor showers known as the Taurids (which are encountered as the Northern and Southern Taurids across November, and the Beta Taurids in late June and early July). A shower has similarly been reported affecting Mercury.

Near-Earth object  may be a fragment of Encke.

Mercury 
Measurements on board the NASA satellite MESSENGER have revealed Encke may contribute to seasonal meteor showers on Mercury. The Mercury Atmospheric and Surface Composition Spectrometer (MASCS) instrument discovered seasonal surges of calcium since the probe began orbiting the planet in March 2011. The spikes in calcium levels are thought to originate from small dust particles hitting the planet and knocking calcium-bearing molecules into the atmosphere in a process called impact vaporization. However, the general background of interplanetary dust in the inner Solar System cannot, by itself, account for the periodic spikes in calcium. This suggests a periodic source of additional dust, for example, a cometary debris field.

Effects on Earth
More than one theory has associated Encke's Comet with impacts of cometary material on Earth, and with cultural significance.

The Tunguska event of 1908 may have been caused by the impact of a cometary body and has also been postulated by Czechoslovakian astronomer Ľubor Kresák as possibly caused by a fragment of Comet Encke.

A theory holds that the ancient symbol of the swastika appeared in a variety of cultures across the world at a similar time, and could have been inspired by the appearance of a comet from head on, as the curved jets would be reminiscent of the swastika shape (see Comets and the swastika motif). Comet Encke has sometimes been identified as the comet in question. In their 1982 book Cosmic Serpent (page 155) Victor Clube and Bill Napier reproduce an ancient Chinese catalogue of cometary shapes from the Mawangdui Silk Texts, which includes a swastika-shaped comet, and suggest that some comet drawings were related to the breakup of the progenitor of Encke and the Taurid meteoroid stream. Fred Whipple in his The Mystery of Comets (1985, page 163) points out that Comet Encke's polar axis is only 5 degrees from its orbital plane: such an orientation is ideal to have presented a pinwheel like aspect to our ancestors when Encke was more active.

Astronomers planned a 2019 search campaign for fragments of comet Encke which would have been visible from Earth as the Taurid swarm passed between July 5–11, and July 21 – August 10. There were no reports of discoveries of any such objects.

Importance in the scientific history of luminiferous aether

Comet Encke (and Biela's Comet) had a role in scientific history in the generally discredited concept of luminiferous aether. As its orbit was perturbed and shortened, the shortening could only be ascribed to the drag of an "ether" through which it orbited in outer space. One reference reads:

Encke's comet is found to lose about two days in each successive period of 1,200 days. Biela's comet, with twice that length of period, loses about one day. That is, the successive returns of these bodies is found to be accelerated by this amount. No other cause for this irregularity has been found but the agency of the supposed ether.

Encke's pole tumbles in an 81-year period, therefore it will accelerate for half that time, and decelerate for the other half of the time (since the orientation of the comets rotation to solar heating determines how its orbit changes due to outgassing forward or aft of the comet's course). The authors of this 1860 textbook of course could not know that the pole of the comet would tumble as it does over such a long period of time, or that outgassing would induce a thrust to change its course.

Gallery

References 
 

 Klačka, Jozef (1999). "Meteor Streams of Comet Encke. Taurid Meteor Complex". Abstract
 Whipple, F.L. (1940). "Photographic meteor studies. III. The Taurid shower." Proc. Amer. Phil. Soc., 83, 711–745.
 Master, S. and Woldai, T. (2004) The UMM Al Binni structure in the Mesopotamian marshlands of Southern Iraq, as a postulated late holocene meteorite impact crater : geological setting and new LANDSAT ETM + and Aster satellite imagery. Johannesburg, University of Witwatersrand, Economic Geology Research Institute (EGRI), 2004. EGRI - HALL : information circular 382, p. 21
     http://www.itc.nl/library/Papers_2004/tech_rep/woldai_umm.pdf (1.56 MB)
 Master, S. and Woldai, T. (2004) Umm al Binni structure, southern Iraq, as a postulated late holocene meteorite impact crater : new satellite imagery and proposals for future research. Presented at the ICSU workshop : comet - asteroid impacts and human society, Santa Cruz de Tenerife, Canary Islands, Spain, November 27- December 2, 2004. p. 20
 Hamacher, D. W. (2005) "The Umm Al Binni Structure and Bronze Age Catastrophes", The Artifact: Publications of the El Paso Archaeological Society, Vol. 43
 Hamacher, D. W. (2006) "Umm al Binni lake: Effects of a possible Holocene bolide impact", Astronomical Society of Australia Meeting 40, #15

External links 

 Orbital simulation from JPL (Java) / Ephemeris
 2P/Encke at the Minor Planet Center's Database
 Gary W. Kronk's Cometography page for 2P
 2P/Encke light curve by Seiichi Yoshida

Encke-type comets
Periodic comets
0002
002P
17860117
1786
Meteor shower progenitors
Comets in 2013
Comets in 2017
Comets in 2020
Articles containing video clips
Discoveries by Pierre Méchain